Jinzhou Station is an elevated station of Line 4 of the Guangzhou Metro. It is located at the junction of Shuangshan Avenue and Guangfeng Road in the town of Huangge, Nansha District.

The previous name of the station was "Chongwei Station". Since May 2006, its name has changed to Jinzhou Station before the station put into service in 2007.

Station layout

Exits

References

Railway stations in China opened in 2007
Guangzhou Metro stations in Nansha District